Gustaf Nilsson may refer to:
Gustaf Nilsson (footballer, born 1922) (1922–2004), Swedish footballer
Gustaf Nilsson (footballer, born 1997), Swedish footballer
Gustaf Nilsson (wrestler) (1899–1980), Swedish wrestler